Risto Lumi (born on 17 May 1971 in Tallinn) is an Estonian military personnel (Lieutenant Colonel).

From 2006-2008 he was the commander of Headquarters of the Estonian Defence Forces' intelligence department. From 2008-2011 he was Estonian Military Attaché in Georgia.

In 2005 he was awarded with Order of the Cross of the Eagle, V class.

References

Living people
1971 births
Estonian military personnel
Recipients of the Military Order of the Cross of the Eagle, Class V
People from Tallinn